Steven Ukoh (born 19 June 1991) is a professional footballer who plays for FC 08 Villingen as a midfielder.

Born in Switzerland, he represents Nigeria at international level.

Club career
Ukoh has played club football for Young Boys II, FC Lugano and FC Biel-Bienne.

International career
After playing youth football for Switzerland, Ukoh switched allegiance to Nigeria in December 2014. He made his senior international debut for Nigeria in January 2015.

References

1991 births
Living people
Swiss men's footballers
Nigerian footballers
BSC Young Boys players
FC Lugano players
FC Biel-Bienne players
FC Solothurn players
FC La Chaux-de-Fonds players
FC 08 Villingen players
Swiss Challenge League players
Swiss Promotion League players
Oberliga (football) players
Association football midfielders
Switzerland youth international footballers
Nigeria international footballers
Expatriate footballers in Germany